The National Capital Territory of Delhi has seven District Courts that function under the Delhi High Court:
 Tis Hazari Courts Complex, established 1958
 Patiala House Courts Complex, established 1977
 Karkardooma Courts Complex, established 1993
 Rohini Courts Complex, established 2005
 Dwarka Courts Complex, established 2008
 Saket Courts Complex, established 2010
 Rouse Avenue  Courts Complex, established 2019

The above are seven physical locations of the district courts, whereas actually there are eleven district courts headed by individual District Judges. The Tis Hazari complex, Rohini complex and Saket complex hosts two districts each while the Karkardooma complex hosts three districts and the remaining complexes host one district court each.

References

District Courts of India
Delhi High Court